Application may refer to:

Mathematics and computing
 Application software, computer software designed to help the user to perform specific tasks
 Application layer, an abstraction layer that specifies protocols and interface methods used in a communications network
 Function application, in mathematics and computer science

Processes and documents
 Application for employment, a form or forms that an individual seeking employment must fill out
 College application, the process by which prospective students apply for entry into a college or university
 Patent application, a document filed at a patent office to support the grant of a patent

Other uses
 Application (virtue), a characteristic encapsulated in diligence
 Topical application, the spreading or putting of medication to body surfaces

See also
 
 Apply